Firefly is the third studio album by Australian country music singer Sara Storer. It was released in July 2005 and peaked at number 24 on the ARIA Charts.

At the ARIA Music Awards of 2005, the album was nominated for ARIA Award for Best Country Album, losing to Be Here by Keith Urban.
At the Country Music Awards of Australia in 2006, Storer won the Female Vocalist of the Year award for the track "Firefly".

Track listing
 "The Ballad of Tommy Foster" – 3:09
 "Crazy as it Seems" – 3:09
 "Billabong" – 3:24
 "Important Things"  (with Josh Cunningham)  – 3:24
 "Firefly" – 3:41
 "Since I've Gone" – 2:55
 "Snow in Mid-July" – 3:09
 "Star" – 3:15
 "Molly Green" – 2:41
 "Chillers Bend" – 3:31
 "Dungarees" – 2:46
 "Walk the Landings" – 3:39
 "Must've Been a Hell of a Party"  (with Paul Kelly)  – 3:01
 "Angel" – 3:56

Charts

Weekly charts

Year-end charts

Certifications

References

2005 albums
Sara Storer albums